Hookham is a surname. Notable people with the surname include:

John Hookham Frere (1769–1846), English diplomat and author
Shenpen Hookham, English Buddhist teacher
Thomas Hookham (ca.1739-1819), English bookseller
William Hookham Carpenter (1792–1866), English museum employee